Jenkins County is a county located in the southeastern area of the U.S. state of Georgia. As of the 2020 census, the population was 8,674. The county seat is Millen. The county was created on August 17, 1905, and named after the 44th Governor of Georgia, Charles Jones Jenkins.

History
During the Red Summer of 1919, there was a race riot on April 13, 1919 in Jenkins County, in which white mobs attacked the black community.

Geography

Most of the southern portion of Jenkins County, from southwest of Millen to west of Hiltonia, is located in the Lower Ogeechee River sub-basin of the Ogeechee River basin, with the exception of very small parts of the southwestern corner of the county, north and east of Garfield, which are located in the Canoochee River sub-basin of the same Ogeechee River basin.  The northwestern portion of Jenkins County is located in the Upper Ogeechee River sub-basin of the Ogeechee River basin, with just the northeastern corner of the county located in the Brier Creek sub-basin of the Savannah River basin.

Major highways

  U.S. Route 25
  State Route 17
  State Route 17 Bypass
  State Route 21
  State Route 23
  State Route 67
  State Route 121
  State Route 555 (Savannah River Parkway)
  State Route 565 (Savannah River Parkway)

Adjacent counties
 Burke County (north)
 Screven County (east)
 Bulloch County (south)
 Emanuel County (west)

Demographics

2000 census
As of the census of 2000, there were 8,575 people, 3,214 households, and 2,269 families living in the county.  The population density was 24 people per square mile (9/km2).  There were 3,907 housing units at an average density of 11 per square mile (4/km2).  The racial makeup of the county was 56.29% White, 40.49% Black or African American, 0.15% Native American, 0.21% Asian, 0.09% Pacific Islander, 2.06% from other races, and 0.70% from two or more races.  3.35% of the population were Hispanic or Latino of any race.

There were 3,214 households, out of which 33.70% had children under the age of 18 living with them, 45.90% were married couples living together, 19.70% had a female householder with no husband present, and 29.40% were non-families. 25.60% of all households were made up of individuals, and 11.30% had someone living alone who was 65 years of age or older.  The average household size was 2.63 and the average family size was 3.16.

In the county, the population was spread out, with 28.50% under the age of 18, 9.20% from 18 to 24, 26.40% from 25 to 44, 22.30% from 45 to 64, and 13.60% who were 65 years of age or older.  The median age was 35 years. For every 100 females there were 92.00 males.  For every 100 females age 18 and over, there were 86.70 males.

The median income for a household in the county was $24,025, and the median income for a family was $29,539. Males had a median income of $28,804 versus $20,252 for females. The per capita income for the county was $13,400.  About 22.30% of families and 28.40% of the population were below the poverty line, including 39.60% of those under age 18 and 25.50% of those age 65 or over.

2010 census
As of the 2010 United States Census, there were 8,340 people, 3,192 households, and 2,164 families living in the county. The racial makeup of the county was 54.9% white, 40.5% black or African American, 0.4% Asian, 0.3% American Indian, 2.6% from other races, and 1.2% from two or more races. Those of Hispanic or Latino origin made up 4.0% of the population. In terms of ancestry, 13.0% were American, 10.1% were English, 7.4% were Irish, and 6.3% were German.

Of the 3,192 households, 34.7% had children under the age of 18 living with them, 42.1% were married couples living together, 20.3% had a female householder with no husband present, 32.2% were non-families, and 28.7% of all households were made up of individuals. The average household size was 2.59 and the average family size was 3.16. The median age was 38.2 years.

The median income for a household in the county was $27,686 and the median income for a family was $35,876. Males had a median income of $36,391 versus $25,814 for females. The per capita income for the county was $17,629. About 17.6% of families and 19.1% of the population were below the poverty line, including 24.1% of those under age 18 and 20.8% of those age 65 or over.

2020 census

As of the 2020 United States census, there were 8,674 people, 3,443 households, and 2,095 families residing in the county.

Communities
 Millen
 Perkins

Politics

See also

 Camp Lawton (Georgia)
 Central Savannah River Area
 National Register of Historic Places listings in Jenkins County, Georgia
List of counties in Georgia

References

 
Georgia (U.S. state) counties
1905 establishments in Georgia (U.S. state)
Populated places established in 1905